

Albania
 Iván Balliu – Metz – 2016–18
 Lorik Cana – Paris SG, Olympique de Marseille, FC Nantes – 2002–07, 2015–16
 Qazim Laçi – Ajaccio – 2022–23
 Ermir Lenjani – Rennes, FC Nantes – 2014–17
 Riza Lushta – AS Cannes – 1948–49
 Edvin Murati – Paris SG, Lille OSC – 1997–98, 1999–2002

Algeria

A
 Radhouane Abbes – Montpellier HSC – 1987–88, 1989–90
 Boumediene Abderrahmane – FC Sète, Olympique de Marseille - 1945–52, 1953–54
 Djamel Abdoun – AC Ajaccio, Nantes – 2003–06, 2008–09
 Mehdi Abeid – Dijon, Nantes – 2016–21
 Madjid Adjaoud – CS Sedan – 1999–2003
 Laurent Agouazi – Metz, Boulogne – 2005–06, 2007–08, 2009–10
 Rayan Aït-Nouri – Angers – 2018–21
 Nassim Akrour – Troyes AC, Grenoble Foot – 2002–03, 2008–10
 Ridha Ali Messaoud – Paris SG – 1976–77
 Saïd Amara – RC Strasbourg, Béziers, Bordeaux - 1956–58, 1962–64
Houssem Aouar – Lyon – 2016–
Karim Aribi – Nîmes – 2020–21
 Salim Arrache – RC Strasbourg, Olympique de Marseille, Toulouse FC – 2003–08
 Mokhtar Arribi – FC Sète, RC Lens – 1946–51, 1952–55
 Salah Assad – FC Mulhouse, Paris SG – 1982–83, 1984–85
Youcef Atal – Nice – 2018–

B
 Louardi Badjika – SC Bastia – 1981–82
 Salah Bakour – Caen – 2004–05
 Nadjib Baouia – Evian TG – 2012–14
 Kadour Bekhloufi – AS Monaco – 1957–58
 Hamid Belabbes – Stade Français – 1966–67
 Jacky Belabde – Chamois Niortais – 1987–88
 Rachid Belaid – Toulouse FC (1937), FC Nancy, Nice – 1950–51, 1952–54
 Youcef Belaïli – Brest, Ajaccio – 2021–
 Omar Belbey – Montpellier – 2001–02
 Nadir Belhadj – Sedan, Lyon, Lens – 2006–08
 Tahar Belhadj – Le Havre – 1946–47
 Haris Belkebla – Brest – 2019–
 Youssef Belkebla – Saint-Étienne – 1986–88
 Habib Bellaïd – Strasbourg, Boulogne – 2005–06 & 2007–08, 2009–10
 Djamel Belmadi – Paris SG, Marseille, Valenciennes – 1995–96, 1999–02, 2007–09
 Nordine Ben Ali – Colmar – 1948–49
 Said Ben Arab – Bordeaux – 1950–51
 Ali Ben Fadah – Alès, Angers – 1957–60
 Madjid Ben Haddou – Nice – 2002–04
 Alim Ben Mabrouk – RC Paris, Bordeaux, Lyon – 1984–85, 1986–92
 Houcine Ben Said – Mulhouse – 1982–83
 Madani Ben Tahar – Lens – 1964–68
 Abdelhaziz Ben Tifour – Nice, Troyes, AS Monaco – 1948–53, 1954–58
 Ali Benarbia – Martigues, AS Monaco, Bordeaux, Paris SG – 1993–2001
 Djamel Benlamri – Lyon – 2020–21
 Saïd Benrahma – Nice, Angers – 2013–16
 Tedj Bensaoula – Le Havre – 1985–86
 Ramy Bensebaini – Rennes – 2015–19
 Nabil Bentaleb – Angers – 2021–
 Yassine Benzia – Lyon, Lille, Dijon – 2011–21
 Mohamed Bernou – Montpellier – 1948–50
 Bensaad Bettahar – AS Monaco – 1994–95
 Yacine Bezzaz – Ajaccio, Valenciennes – 2002–05, 2006–09
 Ali Bouafia – Marseille, Lyon, Strasbourg, Lorient – 1987–88, 1989–95, 1998–99
 Hameur Bouazza – Arles-Avignon – 2010–11
 Abderrhamane Boubekeur – AS Monaco – 1954–58
 Hocine Bouchache – Le Havre – 1958–61
 Abdelhamid Bouchouk – Sète, Marseille, Toulouse FC (1937) – 1948–51, 1953–58
 Hicham Boudaoui – Nice – 2019–
 Ryad Boudebouz – Sochaux, Bastia, Montpellier, Saint-Étienne – 2008–17, 2019–22
 Fouad Bouguerra – Nantes – 2004–05
 Sadek Boukhalfa – Nantes, Metz – 1963–65, 1967–69
 Farid Boulaya – Bastia, Metz – 2016–18, 2019–22
 Virgile Boumelaha – Sochaux – 2002–03
 Abdelmajid Bourebbou – Rouen, Laval – 1977–83
 Brahim Bourras – Rennes – 1961–63
 Mohamed Bourricha – Nîmes Olympique – 1959–60
 Boudjema Bourtal – Alès – 1958–59
 Mansour Boutabout – Sedan – 2006–07
 Mohamed Bradja – Troyes – 1999–2003
 Mohamed Fadel Brahami – Le Havre – 1999–2000, 2002–03
 Said Brahimi – Toulouse FC (1937) – 1955–58

C
 Hacène Chabri – AS Monaco – 1956–57
 Fathi Chebal – AS Nancy, Metz, RC Paris – 1975–80, 1984–86
 Embarek Chenen – Rouen – 1960–62
 Abdelmalek Cherrad – Nice, Bastia – 2002–05
 Ilyes Chetti – Angers – 2022–

D
 Mustapha Dahleb – Sedan, Paris SG – 1969–71, 1973–84
 Kouider Daho – Sète – 1947–48
 Dahmane Defnoun – Alès, Angers – 1957–60, 1962–64
 Andy Delort – Ajaccio, Caen, Toulouse, Montpellier, Nice, Nantes – 2011–13, 2015–
 Abdel Djaadaoui – Sochaux – 1972–82
 Salah Djebaili – Nîmes Olympique – 1957–66
 Billel Dziri – Sedan – 1999–2000

E
Farid El Melali – Angers – 2018–

F
 Assassi Fellahi – Saint-Étienne – 1953–56
 Karim Fellahi – Saint-Étienne – 2000–01
 Mehdi Fennouche – Toulouse FC – 2013–14
 Kader Ferhaoui – Montpellier, Cannes, Saint-Étienne – 1987–98, 1999–2000
 Zinedine Ferhat – Nîmes – 2019–21
 Said Ferrad – Troyes – 1954–56
 Brahim Ferradj – Brest – 2010–13
 Ahmed Firoud – Rennes, Nice – 1945–46, 1948–53
 Kader Firoud – Saint-Étienne, Nîmes Olympique – 1945–48, 1950–54
 Aissa Fouka – Toulouse FC – 1987–90, 1991–94

G
 Rabah Gamouh – Nîmes Olympique – 1977–81
 Farid Ghazi – Troyes – 1999–2003
 Rachid Ghezzal – Lyon, Monaco – 2012–13, 2014–18
 Kamel Ghilas – Arles-Avignon, Reims – 2010–11, 2012–14
 Faouzi Ghoulam – Saint-Étienne, Angers – 2010–14, 2022–
 Yanis Guermouche – Montpellier – 2021–

H
 Said Hadad – Sète, Marseille, Toulouse FC (1937) – 1946–51, 1953–56
 Fodil Hadjadj – Nantes – 2003–05
 Said Hamimi – Brest – 1981–82
 Riad Hammadou – Lille OSC – 2001–02
 Ziri Hammar – AS Nancy – 2010–13
 Salem Harchèche – Saint-Étienne – 1991–96
 Fethi Harek – Bastia – 2012–14
 Ilias Hassani – Toulouse, Bordeaux – 2013–14, 2015–16
 Brahim Hemdani – Cannes, Strasbourg, Marseille – 1997–2005

I
 Abderrahman Ibrir – Bordeaux, Toulouse FC (1937), Marseille – 1946–53

K
 Kamel Kaci-Said – Cannes – 1997–98
 Foued Kadir – Valenciennes, Marseille, Rennes – 2009–14
 Ahmed Kashi – Metz – 2014–15
 Karim Kerkar – Le Havre – 1998–2000
 Abdelhamid Kermali – Lyon – 1955–58
 Abdelkrim Kerroum – Troyes – 1960–61
 Mahi Khennane – Rennes, Toulouse FC (1937), Nîmes Olympique – 1956–57, 1958–66
 Amar Kodja – Nantes – 1955–56
 Nourredine Kourichi – Valenciennes, Bordeaux, Lille OSC – 1976–86
 Nasreddine Kraouche – Metz – 1998–99

L
 Lamri Laachi – Paris FC, RC Paris – 1973–74, 1978–79, 1984–85
 Kamel Larbi – Nice – 2003–07
 Mohammed Lekkak – Toulouse FC (1937), Rouen, Lyon, Angoulême – 1958–59, 1962–63, 1964–70
 Abdallah Liegeon – AS Monaco, Strasbourg – 1981–87, 1988–89

M
 Raïs M'Bolhi – Rennes – 2017–18
 Rabah Madjer – RC Paris – 1984–85
 Maamar Mamouni – Le Havre – 1996–99
 Anthony Mandrea – Nice, Angers – 2011–12, 2021–22
 Faouzi Mansouri – Nîmes Olympique, Montpellier – 1974–80, 1981–82
 Yazid Mansouri – Le Havre, Lorient – 1997–2000, 2002–03, 2006–10
 Mohamed Maouche – Reims – 1956–58, 1960–61
 Karim Maroc – Lyon, Angers, Tours, Brest – 1976–85
 Abdelkader Mazouz – Nîmes Olympique – 1957–58
 Mohamed Medehbi – Limoges – 1960–61
 Abdeljalil Medioub – Bordeaux – 2021–22
 Carl Medjani – Metz, Lorient, Ajaccio, Valenciennes FC – 2005–07, 2011–14
 Abderahmane Meftah – Toulouse FC (1937), Toulon – 1954–55, 1959–60
 Mourad Meghni – Sochaux – 2005–06
 Rachid Mekhloufi – Saint-Étienne, Bastia – 1954–58, 1963–70
 Mehdi Méniri – AS Nancy, Troyes, Metz – 1997–2006
 Walid Mesloub – Lorient – 2014–16
 Mohamed Mezarra – Lille OSC – 1964–68
 Rafik Mezriche – Strasbourg – 1997–2002
 Ahmed Mihoubi – Sète, Toulouse FC (1937), Lyon – 1946–55
 Mehdi Mostefa – Ajaccio – 2011–12

N
 Rachid Natouri – Metz – 1970–72
 Omar Nekkache – Marseille – 1950–52
 Mohamed Nemeur – Le Havre, Saint-Étienne – 1945–47

O
 Abdelhakim Omrani – Lens – 2008–11
 Abdelnasser Ouadah – AS Nancy, Ajaccio, Metz, Sedan – 1998–2000, 2002–07
 Bilal Ouali – Reims – 2012–13
 Amokrane Oualiken – Nîmes Olympique – 1958–60
 Ahmed Oudjani – Lens, Sedan – 1958–60, 1962–65, 1966–67
 Chérif Oudjani – Lens, Laval, Sochaux – 1983–90
 Alexandre Oukidja – Strasbourg, Metz – 2017–18, 2019–22
 Adam Ounas – Bordeaux, Nice, Lille – 2015–17, 2019–20, 2022–

P
 Mehdi Puch-Herrantz – Ajaccio – 2022–

R
 Amar Rouaï – Angers – 1957–58, 1962–63

S
 Idriss Saadi – Saint-Étienne, Strasbourg – 2010–14, 2017–19, 2020–21
 Hakim Saci – Guingamp, Metz – 2001–04
 Moussa Saïb – Auxerre, AS Monaco, Lorient – 1992–97, 2000–02
 Rafik Saïfi – Troyes, Istres, Ajaccio, Lorient – 1999–2003, 2004–09
 Mohamed Salem – Sedan – 1960–64, 1967–71
 Youssef Salimi – Nice – 1994–97
 Nordine Sam – Strasbourg – 2002–03
 Ben Sames – Stade Français – 1949–50
 Liazid Sandjak – Paris SG, Nice, Saint-Étienne – 1986–92, 1994–96
 Max Sellal – FC Nancy – 1949–51
 Abdelhamid Skander – Bordeaux – 1954–56
 Islam Slimani – AS Monaco, Lyon, Brest – 2019–23
 Abderrahmane Soukhane – Toulouse FC (1937), Red Star – 1964–68
 Maxime Spano – Toulouse FC – 2014–15

T
 Mehdi Tahrat – Angers – 2016–18
 Abdelhafid Tasfaout – Auxerre, Guingamp – 1995–98, 2000–02
 Mohamed Tayeb – Bordeaux – 1963–65, 1966–67
 Djamel Tlemçani – Rouen, Toulon – 1982–85

Y
 Ali Sami Yachir – Montpellier – 2003–04
 Anthar Yahia – Bastia, Nice – 2001–06
 Hassan Yebda – Le Mans – 2006–08

Z
 Abderraouf Zarabi – Ajaccio – 2003–04
 Akim Zedadka – Clermont, Lille, Auxerre – 2021–
 Mehdi Zeffane – Lyon, Rennes, Clermont – 2013–19, 2022–
 Mehdi Zerkane – Bordeaux – 2020–22
 Karim Ziani – Troyes, Sochaux, Marseille – 2001–03, 2006–09
 Mustapha Zitouni – AS Monaco – 1954–58
 Abdelhamid Zouba – Nîmes Olympique – 1963–64

Angola
Jérémie Bela – Dijon, Clermont – 2016–17, 2022–
 Hélder Costa – Monaco – 2015–16
Luís Delgado – Metz – 2007–08

Argentina

A
 Roberto Aballay – FC Nancy, Metz – 1950–55
 Alberto Acosta – Toulouse FC – 1990–91
 Roberto Alarcón – Marseille – 1950–53
 Daniel Alberto – Paris FC, Lens, Rouen, Laval – 1978–85, 1986–88
 Sergio Bernardo Almirón – Monaco – 2007–08
 Alejandro Alonso – Bordeaux, Monaco, Saint-Étienne – 2005–13
 Norberto Alonso – Marseille – 1976–77
 Antonio Ameijenda – Red Star – 1972–73
 Federico Andrada – Metz – 2014–15
 Osvaldo Ardiles – Paris SG – 1982–83
 José Arias – Stade Français, Troyes – 1953–54, 1955–56
 Juan Carlos Auzoberry – Nice – 1959–64, 1965–67

B
 Leonardo Balerdi – Marseille – 2020–
 Ángel Bargas – Nantes, Metz – 1973–81
 Rolando Barrera – Nice – 1985–87
 Horacio Barrionuevo – Nice – 1966–67
 Pablo Barzola – Caen – 2008–09, 2010–11
 Gonzalo Belloso – Strasbourg – 1999–2001
 Henri Bellunza – Excelsior Roubaix, Le Havre – 1933–35, 1945–46
 Darío Benedetto – Marseille – 2019–22
 Walter Benítez – Nice – 2016–22
 Gonzalo Bergessio – Saint-Étienne – 2009–11
 Eduardo Berizzo – Marseille – 1999–2000
 Lucas Bernardi – Marseille, Monaco – 2000–08
 Attilio Bernasconi – Rennes, Lille – 1934–35, 1936–37
 Facundo Bertoglio – Evian – 2013–14
 Claudio Biaggio – Bordeaux – 1996–97
 Carlos Bianchi – Reims, Paris SG, Strasbourg – 1973–80
 Daniel Bilos – Saint-Étienne – 2006–07
 Nicolás Blandi – Evian – 2014–15
 Joaquín Blázquez – Brest – 2022–
 Mariano Bombarda – Metz – 1996–97
 Humberto Rafael Bravo – Paris FC – 1978–79
 Ruben Bravo – Nice – 1954–57
 José Luis Brown – Brest – 1986–87
 Jorge Burruchaga – Nantes, Valenciennes – 1985–93
 Diego Bustos – Nantes – 1998–2000

C
 Roberto Cabral – Lille – 1978–81
 Juan Cabrera – Bordeaux – 1979–80
 Darío Cabrol – Toulouse FC – 2000–01
 Pablo Calandria – Marseille – 2000–01
 Gabriel Calderón – Paris SG, Caen – 1987–90, 1992–93
 Juan Calichio – Rennes – 1951–52
 José Angel Cammameri – AS Monaco – 1967–68
 Luis Carniglia – Nice – 1951–52, 1953–55
 Guido Carrillo – Monaco – 2015–18
 Raúl Alfredo Cascini – Toulouse FC – 2000–01
 Raúl Castronovo – AS Nancy – 1971–74
 Fernando Cavenaghi – Bordeaux – 2007–11
 Mauro Cetto – Nantes, Toulouse FC, Lille – 2001–10, 2011–12
 Pablo Chavarría – Lens, Reims – 2014–15, 2018–19
 Enrique Chazarreta – Avignon – 1975–76
 Ricardo Cherini – Rennes – 1972–74
 Rondolfo Cisneros – RC Paris, Strasbourg – 1947–51
 Renato Civelli – Marseille, Nice, Lille – 2005–07, 2008–13, 2015–17
 Sérgio Comba – Nantes – 1998–99
 Raúl Conti – AS Monaco – 1953–56
 Alberto Costa – Montpellier – 2009–10
 Ariel Cozzoni – Nice – 1990–91
 José Luis Cuciuffo – Nîmes Olympique – 1991–93
 Leandro Cufré – AS Monaco – 2006–09
 Hugo Curioni – Nantes, Metz, Troyes – 1974–78
 Darío Cvitanich – Nice – 2012-15

D
 Fernando D'Amico – Lille OSC, Le Mans – 2000–04
 Patricio D'Amico – Metz – 2000–01
 Omar da Fonseca – Tours, Paris SG, AS Monaco, Toulouse FC – 1982–83, 1984–90
 Osvaldo Dandru – Nice – 1959–64
 Héctor De Bourgoing – Nice, Bordeaux – 1959–69
 César Delgado – Lyon – 2007–11
 Eduardo Di Loreto – Le Havre, Toulouse FC (1937) – 1953–54, 1955–58
 Ángel Di María – Paris SG – 2015–22
 Ramón Díaz – AS Monaco – 1989–91
 Franco Dolci – Nice – 2003–06
 Jorge Domínguez – Nice, Toulon – 1985–88
 Sebastián Dubarbier – Lorient – 2009–12

E
 Juan Eluchans – Caen – 2007–09
 Juan Esnáider – Ajaccio – 2002–03
 Juán Esposto – Antibes – 1936–37
 Mario Evaristo – Antibes – 1936–38

F
 Néstor Fabbri – Nantes, Guingamp – 1998–2003
 Jesus Fandino – Metz – 1972–73
 José Farías – RC Paris, Strasbourg, Red Star – 1962–70
 Augusto Fernández – Saint-Étienne – 2009–10
 Brian Fernández – Metz – 2017–18
 Eduardo Flores – AS Nancy – 1972–73
 José Oscar Florindo – FC Nancy – 1961–63
 Juan Pablo Francia – Bordeaux – 2001–07
 Fabricio Fuentes – Guingamp – 2003–04
 Esteban Fuertes – Lens – 2000–01

G
 Nicolás Gaitán – Lille – 2019–20
 Marcelo Gallardo – AS Monaco, Paris SG – 1999–2003, 2007–08
 Diego Garay – Strasbourg – 1999–2000
 Claudio García – Lyon – 1989–90
 Pascual Garrido – Bastia – 1997–98
 Orlando Gauthier – FC Nancy, Lille OSC, Aix – 1960–63, 1964–65, 1967–68
 Miguel Giachello – Troyes – 1975–76
 Ernesto Gianella – Reims, AS Monaco, Nîmes Olympique – 1963–65, 1969–70
 Christian Eduardo Giménez – Marseille – 2005–06
 Diego Gómez – Angers – 2015–16
 Sergio Goycochea – Brest – 1992
 Pancho Gonzales – Nice – 1951–61
 Lucho González – Marseille – 2009–12
 Mario Gordiano – Stade Français – 1966–67
 Andrés Grande – Bastia – 1998–99

H
 Gabriel Heinze – Paris SG, Marseille – 2001–04, 2009–11
 Ramón Heredia – Paris SG – 1977–79
 Mariano Herrón – Montpellier – 1998–99
 Jorge Higuaín – Brest – 1987–88

I
 Hugo Ibarra – AS Monaco – 2003–04
 Mauro Icardi – Paris SG – 2019–

J
 Victor Hugo Jarra – Red Star – 1974–75

K
 Juan Angel Krupoviesa – Marseille – 2007–08

L
 Hugo Lamanna – CA Paris – 1937–38
 Pedro Lara – Le Havre – 1952–53
 César-Auguste Laraignée – Reims, Laval – 1972–79
 Miguel Ángel Lauri – Sochaux – 1936–39
 Giovani Lo Celso – Paris SG – 2016–18
 Gabriel Loeschbor – Rennes – 2002–04
 Alex Lombardini – Le Havre – 1951–54
 Lisandro López – Lyon – 2009–13
 Juan Carlos Lorenzo – FC Nancy – 1952–54

M
 Hector Maison – Nice, Lyon – 1961–64, 1965–69
 Emanuel Mammana – Lyon – 2016–17
 Damián Manso – Bastia – 2001–02
 Alberto Márcico – Toulouse FC – 1985–92
 Ángel Marcos – Nantes – 1971–75
 Robert Marteleur – Lyon – 1959–60
 Joaquin Martinez – Laval – 1977–78
 Javier Mazzoni – Nantes – 1996–97
 Facundo Medina – Lens – 2020–
 Herman Medina – Lorient – 2001–02
 Mario Mendoza – Nîmes Olympique – 1973–74
 Lionel Messi – Paris SG – 2021–
 Guido Milán – Metz – 2014–15, 2016–17
 José Ismael Montagnoli – Sochaux, Metz – 1951–52, 1953–54
 Daniel Montenegro – Marseille – 1999-00
 Ricardo Montivero – Troyes – 1973–74
 Nestor Mourglia – Lyon – 1976–77
 Aurelio Moyano – FC Nancy – 1962–63
 Oscar Muller – Nantes, Rennes – 1974–84, 1985–86
 Ramon Muller – Sochaux, Strasbourg, Nantes – 1961–62, 1962–68
 Rubén Muñoz – Red Star, Strasbourg, Ajaccio – 1965–68
 Alberto Muro – Sochaux, Nice, FC Nancy – 1951–59, 1960–62

N
 Ricardo-Horacio Neumann – Bastia – 1974–76
 Raúl Nogués – Marseille, Monaco, Nice, Saint-Étienne – 1974–82

O
Lucas Ocampos – Monaco, Marseille – 2013–16, 2017–19
 Julio Olarticoechea – Nantes – 1986–87
 Delio Onnis – Reims, AS Monaco, Tours, Toulon – 1971–76, 1977–86
 Lucas Orbán – Bordeaux – 2013–14

P
 José Luis Palomino – Metz – 2014–15
 Leandro Paredes – Paris SG – 2018–
 Javier Pastore – Paris SG – 2011–18
 José Omar Pastoriza – AS Monaco – 1973–76
 Ignacio Peña – Reims, Rouen – 1973–75, 1977–78
 Gabriel Peñalba – Lorient – 2009–10
  – RC Paris – 1938–39
 Miguel Pérez – AS Monaco – 1966–67
 Osvaldo Piazza – Saint-Étienne – 1974–79
 Diego Placente – Bordeaux – 2008–10
 Gerónimo Poblete – Metz – 2017–18
 Mauricio Pochettino – Paris SG, Bordeaux – 2000–04
 Ezequiel Ponce – Lille – 2017–18
 Antonio Jorge Porcel – Metz – 1952–53

R
 Nestor Rambert – Lyon – 1969–70
 Víctor Ramos – Nantes, Toulon – 1984–87
 Héctor Rial – Marseille – 1962–63
 Juan Risso – Ajaccio – 1967–70
 Carlos Robelle – Rouen – 1961–64
 Ralando Robinet – Toulon – 1964–65
 Leonardo Rodríguez – Toulon – 1991–92
 Pablo Rodríguez – Nice – 2002–03
 Raul Rodríguez – Bordeaux – 1967–68
 Sebastián Ariel Romero – Toulouse FC – 2000–01
 Sergio Romero – Monaco – 2013–14
 Silvio Romero – Rennes – 2013–14
 Julio Hernán Rossi – Nantes – 2005–07
 Ruben Rossi – Toulouse FC – 1997–98
 Marco Ruben – Evian – 2013–14
 Gerónimo Rulli – Montpellier – 2019–20

S
 Emiliano Sala – Bordeaux, Caen, Nantes – 2014–19
 Eduardo Salladare – Stade Français – 1960–62
 Santiago Santamaría – Reims – 1974–79
 Rafael Santos – Nantes, Nice – 1963–69
 Javier Saviola – Monaco – 2004–05
 Raúl Sbarra– Sochaux, Valenciennes – 1936–39
 Juan Simón – AS Monaco, RC Strasbourg – 1983–88
 Juan Pablo Sorín – Paris SG – 2003–04
 Carlos Sosa – RC Paris – 1952–53, 1954–58
 Franco Sosa – Lorient – 2009–11
 Guillermo Stábile – Red Star – 1935–38

T
Nicolas Tagliafico – Lyon – 2022–
 Fabio Talarico – Cannes – 1990–91
 Carlos Daniel Tapia – Brest – 1987–88
 Aníbal Tarabini – Monaco – 1973–75
 Alberto Tarantini – Bastia, Toulouse FC – 1983–88
 Horacio Tellechea – Metz – 1938–39
 Oscar Tellechea – Sochaux, Metz – 1936–37, 1938–39
 Hector Toublanc – Rennes – 1970–73
 Marcelo Trapasso – Sochaux – 2001–05
 Juan Carlos Trebucq – Troyes – 1973–74
 Óscar Trejo – Toulouse FC – 2013–17
 Jorge Trezeguet – Rouen – 1977–78
 Alfonso Troisi – Marseille – 1974–75
 Enzo Trossero – Nantes – 1979–81
 Víctor Trossero – Nantes, AS Monaco, Montpellier – 1978–82
 Mario Hector Turdo – Rennes – 2000–01
 Eduardo Tuzzio – Marseille – 2001–03

V
 Valentin Vada – Bordeaux, Saint-Étienne  – 2015–19
 Vasquez – RC Paris – 1951–52
 Óscar Vega – FC Nancy – 1950–53
 Juan Carlos Verdeal – Lille OSC – 1950
 José Luis Villareal – Montpellier – 1995–97
 Carlos Volante – Rennes, Olympique Lillois, CA Paris – 1934–36, 1937–38

Y
 Héctor Yazalde – Marseille – 1975–77
 Alfredo Yorlano – Grenoble – 1962–63

Z
 Fernando Zappia – Nancy, Metz, Lille – 1980–90
 Luciano Zavagno – Strasbourg, Troyes – 1997–2002
 Roberto Zywica – Reims, Troyes – 1971–75

Armenia
 Gaël Andonian – Marseille – 2014–15
 Éric Assadourian – Toulouse FC, Lille, Lyon, Guingamp – 1988–97
 Michel Der Zakarian – Nantes, Montpellier – 1981–97
 Apoula Edel – Paris SG – 2009–11

Australia
 Ross Aloisi – Lorient – 1998–99
 Zlatko Arambasic – Metz – 1994–95
 Nick Carle – Troyes – 2001–02
 Frank Farina – Strasbourg, Lille OSC – 1992–95
 Denis Genreau – Toulouse – 2022–
 Eddie Krncevic – Mulhouse – 1989–90
 Robbie Slater – Lens – 1991–94 
 Mile Sterjovski – Lille OSC – 2000–04
 Ned Zelic – Auxerre – 1996–97

Austria
 Josef Adelbrecht – RC Paris – 1934–35
 Anton Artes – Rouen – 1936–37
 Lukas Aurednik – Lens – 1954–56
 Hans Babineck – Cannes – 1933–38
 Johann Blaschek – Metz, Le Havre – 1936–37, 1945–46
 Engelbert Boesch – Mulhouse – 1936–37
 Karl Böhm – SC Nîmes – 1933–35
 Ernst Bokon – Metz – 1954–56
 Karl Bortoli – Le Havre – 1961–62
 Georg Braun – Rennes – 1935–36
 Theodor Brinek – AS Monaco – 1953–55
 Anton Cay – Antibes, Strasbourg – 1934–38
 Muhammed Cham – Clermont – 2022–
 Franz Chloupek – Strasbourg – 1935–36
 Josef Chloupek – Marseille – 1934–35
 Franz Cisar – Metz – 1936–37
 Franz Czernicky – Fives – 1932–38
 Flavius Daniliuc – Nice – 2020–22
Kevin Danso – Lens – 2021–
 Karl Decker – Sochaux – 1954–56
 Friedrich Donenfeld – Marseille, Red Star – 1937–38, 1945–46
 Leopold Drucker – Marseille – 1933–34
 Adolf Dumser – Antibes – 1932–33
 Karl Durspekt – Rouen – 1936–38
 Leopold Eckenhofer – Rouen, Strasbourg – 1936–38
 Franz Flach – Antibes, Cannes – 1933–35
 Johann Flegel – Mulhouse – 1934–35
 Erwin Forster – AS Monaco – 1956–58
 Franz Freiberger  – Metz – 1932–33
 Karl Gall – Mulhouse – 1936–37
 Josef Gottwald – Metz – 1935–36
 Adrian Grbić – Lorient – 2020–
 Mario Haas – Strasbourg – 1999–2000
 Erich Habitzl – Lens – 1954–56
 Josef Hanke – Excelsior Roubaix – 1936–38
 Franz Hanreiter – Rouen – 1936–38
 Ernst Happel – RC Paris – 1954–56
 Franz Hauswirth  – Metz – 1932–33, 1935–36
 Gottlieb Havlicek – Strasbourg – 1934–35
 Johann Hoffmann – Strasbourg, Sochaux – 1935–38
 Walter Horak – Sochaux – 1961–62
 Philipp Hosiner  – Rennes – 2014–15
 Rudolf Hudecek– Antibes – 1935–38
 Karl Humenberger – Strasbourg, Saint-Étienne – 1936–39
 Franz Jawurek – RC Paris – 1933–34
 Josef Jelinek  – CO Roubaix-Tourcoing, Sète – 1945–46, 1948–51
 Camillo Jerusalem – Sochaux, CO Roubaix-Tourcoing, Colmar – 1938–39, 1945–49
 Auguste Jordan – RC Paris, Red Star – 1933–39, 1945–48
 Matthias Kaburek – Metz – 1936–38
 Günter Kaltenbrunner – Nice – 1970–72
 Franz Kekeiss – Cannes – 1933–37
 Alfred Kern – Antibes – 1934–35
 Herwig Kircher – Laval – 1979–81
 Karl Klima – Antibes – 1932–35
 Walter Kogler – Cannes – 1997–98
 Fritz Kominek – Nîmes Olympique, Strasbourg, Lens – 1954–57, 1958–61
 Karl Krebs  – Bordeaux, Toulouse FC (1937) – 1946–49
 Rudolf Kumhofer  – Mulhouse –1932–33, 1934–36
 Franz Kurka  – Marseille – 1933–36
 Karl Lechner  – Bordeaux, Rennes – 1945–49
 Roland Linz – Nice – 2004–05
 Ernst Loewinger – Red Star, Mulhouse – 1932–33, 1935–36
 Josef Madlmayer – Cannes – 1933–34
 Anton Marek – Lens, Nice – 1937–39, 1944–47, 1948–49
 Dario Maresic – Reims – 2019–21
 Andreas Matthäus – Metz, Rouen – 1932–33, 1936–39
 Wolfgang Matzky – Valenciennes – 1958–61, 1962–67
 Helmut Mätzler – Nice – 1970–71
 Irme Mausner – Cannes – 1937–39
 Ludwig Mautner – FC Sète, Montpellier – 1944–49
 Josef Mayboeck – Rennes – 1935–37
 Johann Moser – Cannes – 1934–35
 Karl Myrka – Metz – 1932–33
 Franz Neubauer – Valenciennes – 1962–63
 Richard Niederbacher – Paris SG – 1984–85
 Robert Pavlicek – Excelsior Roubaix – 1936–38
 Pawanek – Antibes – 1935
 Patrick Pentz – Reims – 2022–23
 Franz Pleyer – Rennes –1933–37, 1945-51
 Adolf Pohan – Antibes, Red Star – 1932–36
 Walter Presch – Hyères, Olympique Lillois, Sète, Red Star, Cannes, Strasbourg – 1932–33, 1934–35, 1936–39, 1945–46
 Eduard Pruss – Antibes – 1937–38
 Alfred Riedl – Metz – 1980–81
 Johann Riegler – Lens – 1961–62
 Franz Sattler – Strasbourg – 1934–35
 Wilhelm Schaden – Hyères, Strasbourg, Sochaux – 1932–33, 1934–37
 Heinz Schilcher – Paris FC, Nîmes Olympique, Strasbourg – 1973–76, 1977–78
 Kurt Schindlauer – Angers – 1956–57
 Josef Schneider – Rennes – 1933–36
 Karl Schott – Mulhouse – 1934–35
 Franz Siedler – Rennes – 1936–37
 Viktor Spechtl – Lens – 1937–39
 Ernst Stojaspal – Strasbourg, Béziers, AS Monaco, Troyes, Metz – 1954–59, 1960–62
 Ludwig Stroh – Rouen – 1936–39
 Ferdinand Swatosch – Mulhouse – 1932–33
 Johann Tandler – Nice – 1933–34
 Ignace Tax – Saint-Étienne – 1938–39, 1944–45
 Adolf Vogel – Excelsior Roubaix – 1937–38
 Wackt  – Rennes – 1933–34
 Georg Waitz – Lens – 1937–38
 Johann Wana – Strasbourg – 1936–37
 Franz Weselik – Mulhouse – 1934–37
 Imre Windner – Olympique Lillois, Valenciennes – 1933–38
 Heinrich Witasky – Le Havre – 1938–39, 1946–47
 Anton Witschel – Fives – 1932–33
 Siegfried Zwiebel – Metz – 1937–38

References and notes

Books

Club pages
AJ Auxerre former players
AJ Auxerre former players
Girondins de Bordeaux former players
Girondins de Bordeaux former players
Les ex-Tangos (joueurs), Stade Lavallois former players
Olympique Lyonnais former players
Olympique de Marseille former players
FC Metz former players
AS Monaco FC former players
Ils ont porté les couleurs de la Paillade... Montpellier HSC Former players
AS Nancy former players
FC Nantes former players
Paris SG former players
Red Star Former players
Red Star former players
Stade de Reims former players
Stade Rennais former players
CO Roubaix-Tourcoing former players
AS Saint-Étienne former players
Sporting Toulon Var former players

Others

stat2foot
footballenfrance
French Clubs' Players in European Cups 1955-1995, RSSSF
Finnish players abroad, RSSSF
Italian players abroad, RSSSF
Romanians who played in foreign championships
Swiss players in France, RSSSF
EURO 2008 CONNECTIONS: FRANCE, Stephen Byrne Bristol Rovers official site

Notes

France
 
Association football player non-biographical articles